In a Way (stylized as IN A WAY) is the debut mini-album by Japanese-American recording artist Joe Inoue, originally released on September 19, 2007. The album only stayed on the Oricon Weekly Album Charts for one week, peaking at number 220.

Track listing
All songs are written, composed, and performed by Joe Inoue.
 "Nowhere" – 3:45
  – 3:26
  – 3:22
  – 3:32
  – 3:22

References

External links
 Joe Inoue's official website  

2007 EPs
Joe Inoue albums
Japanese-language EPs